Sobrenatural—supernatural in Spanish, Portuguese, and Catalan—may refer to:

 Sobrenatural (film) or All of Them Witches, a 1996 Mexican film
 Sobrenatural (album), by Alexis & Fido, or the title song, 2007
 Sobrenatural, an album by Marcos Witt, 2008
 "Sobrenatural", a song by Juan Magán, Álvaro Soler, and Marielle, 2019